Bruce West may refer to:
Bruce West (artist) (born 1939), American artist
Bruce West (electoral district), Canadian electoral district until 1903
Bruce West (provincial electoral district), an electoral riding in Ontario, Canada
Bruce West (footballer) (born 1962), Australian rules footballer in Victoria Football League
Bruce West (newspaperman) (1912–1990), columnist for The Globe and Mail

West, Bruce